Johnson v. United States, 529 U.S. 694 (2000), was a United States Supreme Court case in which the rights of those serving federal probation and supervised release were more clearly defined. The court ruled that "Although such violations often lead to reimprisonment, the violative conduct need not be criminal and need only be found by a judge under a preponderance of the evidence standard, not by a jury beyond a reasonable doubt."

An earlier case of the same name, 333 U.S. 10 (1948), held that a search warrant is always required unless there are exceptional circumstances.

References

United States Supreme Court cases
2000 in United States case law
United States Supreme Court cases of the Rehnquist Court
United States criminal procedure case law